Brandon Q. Morris, pseudonym of Matthias Matting, born 26 August 1966 in Luckenwalde (East Germany), is a German writer of hard science-fiction.

Biography 

After completing his physics studies at the TU Dresden, Matting became an editor at a specialist publisher for computer magazines in Munich. In the following years he worked among other things. as editor for Computer Bild, Wirtschaftswoche, Focus and Heise-Verlag. In addition, he regularly published specialist books on various technical topics as well as several fiction novels. Matting also operated web portals for self-publishers and offered seminars for authors. From February 2015 to December 2017 he was chairman of the board of the German Self Publisher Association, which he co-founded. Under the pseudonym, he has also been a science fiction writer since 2017.

Book features
All of Morris' books have an afterword educational chapter about the subject matter (such as a celestial object like Enceladus or concept like black holes) that drives the plot of the book.

Awards 
 In 2011 Matthias Matting was one of the first winners of the derneuebuchpreis.de (dnbp), endowed with a total of 20,000 euros, in the non-fiction category for Travel to Fukushima.
 Skoutz Award 2019 in the Science Fiction category together with Cliff Allister for the novel Helium-3.
 Fantastik-Literaturpreis Seraph 2020 - nomination longlist “Best Independent Title” for the novel Das Triton-Desaster.

Publications 

 Ice Moon series
 Enceladus Mission (2017)
 Titan Probe (2018)
 Io Encounter (2018)
 Return to Enceladus (2018)
 Jupiter Catastrophe (2018)

 Solar System series
 Hole (2018)
 Silent Sun (2018)
 Rift (2019)
 Triton Disaster (2020)
 Clouds of Venus (2020)
 Dark Spring (2020)
 The Beacon (2021)
 Pluto Debacle (2023)
 The Uranus Fiasco (2023)

 Disturbance series
 The Disturbance (2022)
 The Disturbance 2: The Answer (2022)
 The Disturbance 3: The Truth (2023)

 Proxima Trilogy
 Proxima Rising (2019)
 Proxima Dying (2019)
 Proxima Dreaming (2019)

 Proxima Logfiles
 Marchenko's Children (2021)
 Into the Darkness (2021)
 Into the Light (2021)
 Runaway (2021)
 Evolution (2021)
 Olom (2022)
 Earthward (2022)

Big Rip Trilogy
 The Death of the Universe (2020)
 Ghost Kingdom (2020)
 Rebirth (2020)

Amphirite series
 Amphirite 1: The Black Planet (2020)
 Amphirite 2 (2021)
 Amphirite 3 (2021)

Andromeda series
 Andromeda: The Encounter (2022)
 Andromeda: The Sojourn (2022)
 Andromeda: The Arrival (2022)

The Timeless Artifact series
 Möbius – The Timeless Artifact (2022)
 Möbius 2 – The Timeless Artifact (2022)
 Möbius 3 – The Timeless Artifact (2022)

Mars Nation series
 Mars Nation Part 1 (2019)
 Mars Nation Part 2 (2019)
 Mars Nation Part 3 (2019)

Helium 3 series, co-written by Cliff Allister
 Helium-3: Fight for the Future (2021)
 Helium-3: Death from the Past (2021)

Impact series
 Impact: Titan (2020)
 Impact: Earth (2020)

Standalone novels
 The Wall: Eternal Day (2021) (a companion book, The Wall: Eternal Night (2021) is written by Joshua Calvert)
 Lost Moon: Lunar Eclipse (2022) (a companion book, Lost Moon: Earth Storms (2022) is written by Tim L. Rey)

References

External links 

 Author website
 iSFdb
 Fantastic-fiction.com

21st-century German writers
Hard science fiction
German science fiction writers
People from Brandenburg
1966 births
Living people